Ejer Bavnehøj (also spelled  Ejer Baunehøj) is the third-highest natural point in Denmark (170.35 m).

Geography 
It lies in the southern part of Skanderborg municipality, between the villages of Riis and Ejer.
At its summit is a 13 m tall tower, built in 1924, commemorating the reunion of the south of Jutland with the rest of Denmark after the First World War.

Close to Ejer Bavnehøj lies Yding Skovhøj, another high point, with a height of 172.66 m above sea level but this includes a human built Bronze Age burial mound. Without the Bronze Age mound Yding Skovhøj is a little lower than Denmark's highest non-man-made point, Møllehøj, which is 170.86 m high, 51 cm higher than Ejer Bavnehøj.

History

Historically Ejer Bavnehøj was mostly known as a site for a beacon where signal-fires were lit in order to warn the military and local population if the enemy were on the way.

References

 Welcome to Ejer Bavnehøj
 VisitSkanderborg

Hills of Denmark
Skanderborg Municipality